The 2018 Merrimack Warriors football team represented Merrimack College as a member of the Northeast-10 Conference (NE-10) during the 2018 NCAA Division II football season. Led by sixth-year head coach Dan Curran, Merrimack compiled an overall record of 5–5 with a mark of 5–4 in conference play, placing fifth in the NE-10. The Warriors played their home games at Duane Stadium on North Andover, Massachusetts

Previous season
The Warriors finished the 2017 season 4–6, 4–5 in NE-10 Conference play.

Schedule

References

Merrimack
Merrimack Warriors football seasons
Merrimack Warriors football